New Bremen can refer to:

New Bremen, New York
New Bremen, Ohio